Sidsel Bodholt Nielsen (born 8 November 1989) is a former Danish handball player, who last played for Viborg HK.

References

1989 births
Living people
People from Aabenraa Municipality
Danish female handball players
Sportspeople from the Region of Southern Denmark